Renāte Lāce (18 February 1943 – 3 March 1967) was a Latvian track and field athlete. She won the gold medal at the 1963 Summer Universiade in the 100 metres event, and has got several other medals at Universiade. Lāce competed at the 1964 Summer Olympics – 4th place in the 4 x 100 metres relay.

External links 
 

1943 births
1967 deaths
Latvian female sprinters
Athletes from Riga
Athletes (track and field) at the 1964 Summer Olympics
Olympic athletes of the Soviet Union
Universiade medalists in athletics (track and field)
Universiade gold medalists for the Soviet Union
Medalists at the 1963 Summer Universiade
Medalists at the 1965 Summer Universiade
Soviet female sprinters
Olympic female sprinters